Doug McKay (born 1929) is a former ice hockey player in the NHL.

Doug or Douglas McKay may also refer to:

Douglas McKay (1893–1959), 25th Oregon governor and 35th U.S. Secretary of the Interior
Douglas Imrie McKay (1879–1962), NYPD police commissioner
Doug McKay (public servant) (1923–2012), senior Australian public servant